Christopher Allan Bansil Ellis (born December 5, 1988) is a Filipino-American professional basketball player who last played for Barangay Ginebra San Miguel of the Philippine Basketball Association (PBA). He was selected 6th overall in the 2012 PBA draft by  Barangay Ginebra San Miguel. He is of Filipino descent.

Ellis won the 2013 PBA All-Star Weekend Slamdunk Competition during his rookie season in Digos, Davao del Sur.

Ellis was traded to the Blackwater Elite in August 2017 along with Dave Marcelo, in exchange for Art dela Cruz and Raymond Aguilar. But he had not played for his new team, initially after he was diagnosed with acute renal disease or a kidney issue. In 2019, after his full recovery, Chris is currently playing for Luang Prabang Basketball Team at Thailand Basketball Super League.

PBA career statistics

As of the end of 2017 Season

Season-by-season averages

|-
| align=left | 
| align=left | Barangay Ginebra
| 52 || 26.3 || .449 || .280 || .531 || 4.6 || 1.4 || .7 || .4 || 8.1
|-
| align=left | 
| align=left | Barangay Ginebra
| 43 || 21.9 || .443 || .286 || .688 || 3.8 || 1.2 || .7 || .2 || 7.5
|-
| align=left | 
| align=left | Barangay Ginebra
| 22 || 13.9 || .422 || .222 || .577 || 2.0 || .9 || .3 || .1 || 4.0
|-
| align=left | 
| align=left | Barangay Ginebra
| 32 || 21.1 || .407 || .224 || .636 || 3.8 || 1.3 || .5 || .3 || 5.8
|-
| align=left | 
| align=left | Barangay Ginebra
| 45 || 14.9 || .467 || .351 || .707 || 2.5 || 1.2 || .6 || .3 || 5.0
|-class=sortbottom
| colspan=2 align=center | Career
| 194 || 20.4 || .442 || .275 || .62 7|| 3.5 || 1.2 || .6 || .3 || 6.4

References

1988 births
Living people
American men's basketball players
American sportspeople of Filipino descent
Barangay Ginebra San Miguel players
Basketball players from California
Mary Hardin–Baylor Crusaders men's basketball players
People from Oceanside, California
Philippine Basketball Association All-Stars
Philippines men's national basketball team players
Filipino men's basketball players
Shooting guards
Small forwards
Southeast Asian Games gold medalists for the Philippines
Southeast Asian Games medalists in basketball
University of Mary Hardin–Baylor alumni
American expatriate basketball people in Thailand
Filipino expatriate basketball people in Thailand
Competitors at the 2011 Southeast Asian Games
Barangay Ginebra San Miguel draft picks
Citizens of the Philippines through descent